Elections to Barnsley Metropolitan Borough Council were held on 5 May 1995, with one third of the council up for election. The election resulted in Labour retaining control of the council.

Election result

|- style="background-color:#F9F9F9"
! style="background-color: " |
| Militant Labour
| align="right" | 0
| align="right" | 0
| align="right" | 0
| align="right" | 0
| align="right" | 0.0
| align="right" | 1.9
| align="right" | 422
| align="right" | +1.9
|-

This resulted in the following composition of the council:

Ward results

+/- figures represent changes from the last time these wards were contested.

|- style="background-color:#F9F9F9"
! style="background-color: " |
| Militant Labour
|  Souter C. Ms.
| align="right" | 422
| align="right" | 16.4
| align="right" | N/A
|-

By-elections between 1995 and 1996

References

1995 English local elections
1995
1990s in South Yorkshire